Albert Tangora (July 2, 1903 – April 7, 1978) set the world speed record for sustained typing on a manual keyboard for one hour, 147 words per minute, on October 22, 1923.  After a rest period, he typed 159 words in a one-minute "sprint."   The machine was an Underwood Standard, with a QWERTY keyboard.  His record has never been surpassed on a manual typewriter.

Tangora's speeds in subsequent typing competitions in New York sponsored by the International Commercial Schools Association were slightly slower, due to different scoring rules, but he held the record there as well of 141 words per minute, set in 1937 on a Royal typewriter.  In all he won the competition seven times, finally beaten by a typist using an electric machine.

Tangora lived in Paterson, New Jersey at the time of his 1923 record-setting performance, but he moved to Evanston, Illinois around 1937.

References

"Big Crowd Drawn By Business Show," New York Times, October 23, 1923, page 5.
"Deaths Last Week" (includes Albert Tangora obituary), Chicago Tribune, April 16, 1978, page 47.
 Bliven, Jr., Bruce (1954). The Wonderful Writing Machine. p. 128. Random House, New York

1903 births
1978 deaths
People from Evanston, Illinois
Typing